Coble is a surname. Notable people with the surname include:

 Anna Coble, American biophysicist
 Arthur Byron Coble (1878–1966), American mathematician
 Bob Coble (born 1953), former mayor of Columbia, South Carolina, USA
 Dave Coble (1912–1971), American baseball player
 Drew Coble (born 1947), American baseball umpire
 Eric Coble, playwright and screenwriter
 Robert L. Coble (1928-1992), American materials scientist, known for Coble creep
 Howard Coble (1931–2015),  U.S. Representative from North Carolina
 Paul Coble (born 1953), North Carolina politician, former mayor of Raleigh